Chuck Weaver is a former Republican member of the Illinois Senate for the 37th Senate District. He was appointed in October 2015.  The district he represented included all or parts of Mercer, Lee, Bureau, Henry, Knox, Stark, Peoria, Woodford and Marshall counties in Central Illinois.

Weaver graduated from Dunlap High School and received his bachelor's degree from nearby Bradley University and J.D. from DePaul University College of Law.

Weaver became president, of Weaver Enterprises, operator of 30 Kentucky Fried Chicken franchises.

Weaver has been on the board of the Peoria County Youth Farm, and was chairman of the City of Peoria Zoning Board of Appeals.   he was co-owner of Peoria Builders.  He was elected to an at-large city council seat in the 2011 Peoria City Council election and retained it in the 2015 election.

Weaver was chosen by a Republican committee, and sworn in, as a State Senator for the 37th Senate District in October 2015, joining the 99th Illinois General Assembly in mid-session. He ran unopposed in 2016, winning a four-year term. On January 9, 2020, it was announced that Weaver would withdraw from his reelection bid and retire from the Illinois Senate. He was replaced on the ballot by Republican businessman Win Stoller who would go on to win the election.

As of 2022, he is the chairman of the Peoria County Republican Party.

Committees
Education (Minority Spokesperson); Higher Education; Insurance; Labor; Licensed Activities; Transportation

References

External links
Biography, bills and committees at the 101st Illinois General Assembly
By session: 101st

Republican Party Illinois state senators
1956 births
Living people
Peoria, Illinois City Council members
Bradley University alumni
DePaul University College of Law alumni
Businesspeople from Illinois
21st-century American politicians